The Galata Tower, officially the Galata Kulesi Museum, is an old Genoese tower in the Galata part of the Beyoğlu district of Istanbul, Turkey. Built as a watchtower at the highest point of the (lost) Walls of Galata, the tower is now an exhibition space and museum, and a symbol of Beyoğlu and Istanbul.

History
During the Byzantine period the Emperor Justinian had a tower erected in what was to become Galata. This tower was destroyed during the Fourth Crusade in 1204. 

In 1267 a Genoese colony was established in the Galata part of Constantinople. It was surrounded by walls and the Galata Tower was first built at their highest point as the Christea Turris (Tower of Christ) in Romanesque style in 1348 during an expansion of the colony.

After the Turkish Conquest of Constantinople in 1453,  the Genoese colony was abolished and the walls pulled down. The tower was allowed to survive and was turned into a prison. It was from its roof that, in 1638, Hezarfen Ahmed Çelebi supposedly strapped on wings and made the first intercontinental flight, landing in the Doğancılar Meydanı in Üsküdar on the Asian side of the city, a story of doubtful authenticity recounted by the Ottoman travel writer, Evliya Çelebi. 

From 1717, the Ottomans used the tower to look out for fires (on the Old Istanbul side of the city the Beyazıt Tower served the same function). In 1794, during the reign of Sultan Selim III, the roof was reinforced in lead and wood, but the stairs were severely damaged by a fire. Another fire damaged the building in 1831, after which further restoration work took place.

In 1875, the tower's conical roof was destroyed during a storm. It remained without this roof for the rest of the Ottoman period but, many years later, during restoration work between 1965 and 1967, the conical roof was reconstructed. At the same time the tower's wooden interior was replaced with a concrete structure and it was opened to the public.

In 2020 the Tower was controversially restored then reopened as a museum.  

It is mainly popular for the 360-degree view of Istanbul visible from its observation deck.

Dimensions
The nine-story tower is  excluding the ornament on the top.

Gallery

See also

 Anadoluhisarı and Rumelihisarı
 List of tallest structures built before the 20th century

References

Further reading 
 
 
 
 
 
 
 
 
 
 The Apes Of Galata - NFT Projesi (23 Nisan 2022)

External links 
 Video "Galata Tower, aerial video (4k Ultra HD)"

Towers in Istanbul
Buildings and structures in Beyoğlu
Golden Horn
Romanesque architecture
Towers completed in 1348
Tourist attractions in Istanbul
Fortified towers
14th-century establishments in the Byzantine Empire
Round towers
1348 establishments in Europe
World Heritage Tentative List for Turkey